Scott Hill is a historic home located near Elkins in Randolph County, West Virginia, United States.  It was built in 1892, and is a 2 ½ story, brick Queen Anne style dwelling on a sandstone foundation. It has an asymmetrical shape with a truncated slate covered hipped roof.  The front facade features a large, one-story wraparound porch.  It also has a porte cochere supported by two replacement Ionic order columns.  Also on the property are a contributing one-story, square-plan frame smoke house (c. 1892), carriage house (c. 1892), chicken coop (c. 1920), corn crib (c. 1892), bank barn (c. 1892), equipment shed (c. 1941), and stone ornamental pond (c. 1910).

It was listed on the National Register of Historic Places in 2008.

References

Houses on the National Register of Historic Places in West Virginia
Queen Anne architecture in West Virginia
Houses completed in 1892
Houses in Randolph County, West Virginia
National Register of Historic Places in Randolph County, West Virginia
Farms on the National Register of Historic Places in West Virginia
Historic districts in Randolph County, West Virginia
Historic districts on the National Register of Historic Places in West Virginia
Buildings and structures in Elkins, West Virginia